Borderlands is a boxed tabletop role-playing game adventure for RuneQuest. Originally published by Chaosium in 1982, this edition was republished in 2018 in PDF format as part of Chaosium's RuneQuest: Classic Edition Kickstarter.

Contents
Borderlands is designed for a group of 4-6 medium-powerful and 1-2 beginning characters who have been hired by a duke to help him tame a new holding. The boxed components include a large scale map of a semi-wilderness frontier along the River of Cradles; a handbook for the gamemaster with general information about the area and its important personalities; a book of encounters; and seven individually bound scenarios, that when played in sequence, make up the complete adventure:
A peaceful tour through the region, giving the players a chance to get a lay of the land and meet important personalities.
Outlaw hunt
Rescue the duke's daughter from Tusk Riders
Find and destroy the source of a plague that killed the duke's wife
Destroy a temple of evil newtlings
Retrieve the egg of a giant condor from a mountain peak
Trade the condor's egg for a magic item in the possession of Gonn Orta, a famous giant 
The final scenario then links up with the next Runequest adventure, Griffin Mountain.

Publication history
Borderlands was written by John E. Boyle, Tony Fiorito, Mark Harmon, Janet Kirby, Rudy Kraft, Charlie Krank, Steve Perrin, Sandy Petersen, Greg Stafford, Lynn Willis, and Elizabeth Wolcott, with art by Lisa Free, and was published by Chaosium, Inc. in 1982 as a boxed set containing a 48-page book and a 32-page book, seven pamphlets (4 to 20 pages each), a large map, several small maps, and a mercenary contract sheet.

Although he was only 14 years old at the time, Reid Hoffman's name was featured on the box of Chaosium's RuneQuest role-playing game release Borderlands (1982), receiving equal billing with game designers Steve Perrin, Sandy Petersen and Greg Stafford.

Reception
Steve List reviewed Borderlands in The Space Gamer No. 56. List commented that "This package is not inexpensive, but it's worth the price.  However, the emphasis here is on the scenarios, so Borderlands is not as useful as a source book as Griffin Mountain.  Unlike Griffin Mountain, though, the scenario structure provided requires virtually no scene setting by the GM before play can begin.  For RQ fans, the only reason not to acquire this one is the hope of one day playing in it."

In the November 1982 edition of White Dwarf, Oliver Dickinson called Borderlands "the perfect answer to any GM who does not have time to construct a whole campaign of his/her own." Dickinson found a few minor errors and ambiguous rules, but concluded "this seems to me a splendidly organised and presented campaign."

In the December 1982 edition of Dragon, Robert Plamondon found Borderlands to be a "well conceived and executed composition. The look and quality of the materials is top notch." Plamondon highly recommended the adventure, concluding, "Borderlands stands as a model for all subsequent campaign packages, and will be a worthwhile purchase for any gamer in terms of its utility, design, and aesthetic appeal."

In a retrospective review of Borderlands in Black Gate, John ONeill said "Borderlands is nicely self-contained, and comes with virtually everything you need for a rich adventure-packed campaign."

Reviews
Different Worlds #25 (Oct./Nov., 1982)

References

External links
 

Role-playing game supplements introduced in 1982
RuneQuest adventures